Evan Schwartz may refer to:

 Evan Schwartz (author), American author
 Evan Schwartz (soccer) (born 1987), American soccer player